The Women's bantamweight is a competition featured at the 2019 World Taekwondo Championships, and was held at the Manchester Arena in Manchester, United Kingdom on 18 and 19 May. Bantamweight were limited to a maximum of 53 kilograms in body mass.

Medalists

Results
Legend
DQ — Won by disqualification

Finals

Top half

Section 1

Section 2

Bottom half

Section 3

Section 4

References
Draw
Results

External links
Official website

Women's 53
World